Quadra may refer to:

 Quadra, São Paulo, a municipality in Brazil
 Quadra Island, British Columbia, Canada
 Vancouver Quadra, a federal electoral district in British Columbia, Canada
 , a Royal Canadian Navy cadet training center in Comox, British Columbia
 Macintosh Quadra, a line of computers made by Apple Computer
 Quadra, Telecine introduced by Broadcast Television Systems Inc. in 1993 
 Quadra, a group of four psychological types in the theory of socionics
 Quadra (album), by Brazilian heavy metal band Sepultura
 Quadra Blu, a character from Max Rep comics by illustrator Lyman Dally
 The fighting style of several characters in the anime manga and light novel Aria the Scarlet Ammo

See also
 Juan Francisco de la Bodega y Quadra (1743–1794), Spanish explorer
 Quadra's and Vancouver's Island, the original name of Vancouver Island
 Hostius Quadra, an ancient Roman man described in Seneca's Natural Questions
 Cuadra, a surname